The Aeronautical Museum Belgrade, formerly known as the Yugoslav Aeronautical Museum, is a museum located in Surčin, Belgrade, the capital of Serbia. Founded in 1957, the museum is located adjacent to Belgrade Nikola Tesla Airport. The current facility, designed by architect Ivan Štraus, was opened to the public on 21 May 1989.

History
In 1975 JAT, the national flag carrier, donated  of land for the museum and the museum later purchased further . Construction of the present building of the museum began in the mid-1970s. The construction work dragged on, so it was only in late 1988 that the setting of the first permanent exhibition began. The museum's new location was ceremonially opened on 21 May 1989. 

The museum owns over 200 aircraft previously operated by the Yugoslav Air Force (both royal and communist), Serbian Air Force, and others, as well as aircraft previously flown by several civil airliners and private flying clubs. It also owns the only known surviving example of the Fiat G.50. The most valuable collections are housed in geodesic glass building, with additional aircraft displayed on the surrounding grounds.

The museum also displays wreckage of a downed USAF F-117 Nighthawk and F-16 Fighting Falcon, both shot down during the NATO bombing of Yugoslavia in 1999. In addition, the collection consists of more than 130 aviation engines, more radars, rockets, various aeronautical equipment, over 20,000 reference books and technical documentation as well as more than 200,000 photographs.

Collection
New 'Rocket and Radar' museum exhibition will be constructed.

Existing missiles and radars in museum:
 P-15 Termit
 S-75 Dvina

Gliders

Helicopters

Piston-engine aircraft

Jet aircraft

Other

See also
List of aerospace museums
List of museums in Belgrade

References

External links

 Museum review by TravelDriveRace
 History of the Museum at Jat Airways website
 Belgrade Aviation Museum
 Музеј ваздухопловства-Београд Званична интернет презентација Музеја ваздухопловства-Београд (у изради)
 Aeronautical Museum-Belgrade Official internet presentation of Aeronautical Museum - Belgrade (under construction)
 Virtual tour through museum

Buildings and structures completed in 1989
Aerospace museums
Museums in Belgrade
Ministry of Defence (Serbia)
Serbia
Museums established in 1957
1957 establishments in Serbia
Surčin